Kathryn Holloway is an English Conservative Party politician, and former radio and television presenter, who served as the Bedfordshire Police and Crime Commissioner between 2016 and 2021. She was elected to the post on 5 May 2016, succeeding the previous incumbent, Olly Martins.

Journalism career
Holloway was a presenter on TV-am following the departure of Anne Diamond, and went on to present for Sky News and LBC. She was also a reporter for ITN, and wrote articles for national newspapers. Major stories she covered during her career in journalism include the 1988 Lockerbie bombing, Margaret Thatcher's resignation as Prime Minister in 1990, and the 1991 release of the Birmingham Six.

Political career
From 2000, Holloway was a consultant specialising in crisis management, and has served as an Associate Director of the Cabinet Office's Emergency Planning College. She was selected by Bedfordshire Conservatives as a candidate for the 2016 Police and Crime Commissioner elections on 10 October 2015.

In February 2020, it was announced that Holloway would stand down before the planned 2020 England and Wales police and crime commissioner elections.

References

Year of birth missing (living people)
Living people
British reporters and correspondents
British television newsreaders and news presenters
English television journalists
English women journalists
BBC newsreaders and journalists
ITN newsreaders and journalists
British radio journalists
English radio personalities
Sky News newsreaders and journalists
Police and crime commissioners in England
Conservative Party police and crime commissioners
Place of birth missing (living people)
British women television journalists
British women radio presenters